Yadanabon is a 2017 Burmese drama television series. It aired on MNTV, from April 9, to August 27, 2017, on every Sunday at 19:20 for 20 episodes.

Cast
Hein Wai Yan as Lin Yan
Moe Yan Zun as Moe Naung
Htun Ko Ko as Nyi Min Htet
Aye Wutyi Thaung as May Thaw
Yadanar Bo as Nay Yee
Zun Than Sin as Su Htar Thet
Chit Kyae Hmone as Kyar Nyo

References

Burmese television series
Myanmar National TV original programming